Sex and Violence is the fifth and final album released by hip hop group Boogie Down Productions.  The next year, 1993,  the group's lead member, KRS-One, would begin recording under his own name.

The track "Build And Destroy" deals with KRS-One's ideological differences—as a self-proclaimed humanist—with X Clan and its brand of Afrocentrism. Previously, and on numerous occasions, the X-Clan had denounced any association with the concept, instead affirming its pro-Black stance. This, according to KRS-One's younger brother and Boogie Down Production's DJ Kenny Parker, was an insinuation that KRS was a "sell-out." Both parties have since reconciled their differences and on X-Clan's Return from Mecca album.

KRS One has stated that the album has sold about 250,000 copies, half of what the previous BDP album (Edutainment) sold.  KRS-One has stated that he believes this was due to an incident that year, in which BDP stormed the stage during a concert performance by alternative hip-hop duo PM Dawn, which was in retaliation for the latter's published comments that questioned KRS-One being a self-proclaimed "teacher".

The album track "Say Gal" was written about the rape trial of professional boxer Mike Tyson.

Track listing

Chart positions

See also
 Michel Foucault regarding the intersection of the technique KRS-One used on "Questions and Answers" of interviewing himself, and themes of sex and violence.

References

1992 albums
Boogie Down Productions albums
Jive Records albums
Albums produced by Prince Paul (producer)
Albums produced by KRS-One